"Car Wash" is a song by the American soul and R&B band Rose Royce. Written and arranged by the ex-Motown producer Norman Whitfield, the song was the group's first single and one of the most notable successes of the 1970s disco era. "Car Wash", the theme of the 1976 film Car Wash, was Rose Royce's most successful single and the lead single from their first studio album, the Car Wash soundtrack. Reaching number one on the US Billboard Hot 100 and Hot Soul Singles charts, "Car Wash" also peaked at number three on the National Disco Action Top 30 chart and reached number nine on the UK Singles Chart in February 1977. The song was covered in 2004 by Christina Aguilera and Missy Elliott, who released their version as the single for the Shark Tale soundtrack.

Background
The former Motown Records producer Norman Whitfield had been commissioned to record the soundtrack album for Car Wash by the director Michael Schultz. Although Whitfield did not want the project, he decided to do so, both for financial incentives as well as the chance to give Rose Royce, a disco/funk backing band that Whitfield signed to his own label in 1975, the exposure they needed to become mainstream. Unable to develop a theme song for the film, inspiration finally struck Whitfield while watching a game of basketball, and he wrote his first draft of "Car Wash" on a paper bag from a fried chicken eatery.

The resulting song set the mood and tone for the comedy film it was commissioned for Rose Royce's lead singer Rose Norwalt (Gwen Dickey). It describes a fun and easy-going car washing business, where everything is "always cool/and the boss don't mind sometimes if you act a fool".

The Car Wash soundtrack, a double album, was Rose Royce's first album, and the title track was their first single. "Car Wash" sold 2 million copies and was a number one success on both the Billboard popular and R&B charts in the United States and a top ten success in the United Kingdom. The song was number one on the Billboard Hot 100 for one week, from January 23 to January 29, 1977, replacing "I Wish" by Stevie Wonder and replaced by "Torn Between Two Lovers" by Mary MacGregor. The Car Wash soundtrack album, entirely recorded by Rose Royce and Whitfield, spawned two more successful singles, "I Wanna Get Next to You" and "I'm Going Down" (covered in 1994 by Mary J. Blige).

The Car Wash soundtrack won a 1977 Grammy Award for Best Score Soundtrack Album.

In 1988, the song was re-released as a double A-side single with "Is It Love You're After?" in the United Kingdom, peaking at No. 20.

Track listings
 UK 7" vinyl
"Car Wash" – 3:18
"Water" – 3:31

Charts

Weekly charts
{| class="wikitable sortable plainrowheaders" style="text-align:center;"
|-
!scope="col"| Charts (1976–77)
!scope="col"| Peakposition
|-
!scope="row"|Australia (Kent Music Report)
| style="text-align:center;"|12
|-

|-
!scope="row"|Belgium (Ultratop 50)
|9
|-
!scope="row"| Canada Top Singles (RPM)
| style="text-align:center;"|1
|-
!scope="row"| Finland (Suomen virallinen lista)
| style="text-align:center;"|23
|-

|-

|-
!scope="row"| Ireland (IRMA)<ref>{{cite web|url=http://www.irishcharts.ie/search/placement|title=Irish Singles Chart – Search for song |publisher=Irish Recorded Music Association |accessdate=January 11, 2015 |format=Enter the keyword "Car Wash" into the "Song title" parameter |url-status=dead |archiveurl=https://web.archive.org/web/20090602061251/http://www.irishcharts.ie/search/placement |archivedate=June 2, 2009 }}</ref>
| style="text-align:center;"|20
|-

|-

|-

|-
!scope="row"| UK Singles (OCC)
| style="text-align:center;"|9
|-
!scope="row"| US Billboard Hot 100
| style="text-align:center;"|1
|-
!scope="row"| US Hot Soul Singles (Billboard)
| style="text-align:center;"|1
|-
!scope="row"| US National Disco Action Top 30 (Billboard)
| style="text-align:center;"|3
|-

|-
|}

Year-end charts

Car Wash '98 

In 1998, "Car Wash" was remixed and interpreted in a duet with Gwen Dickey. Officially titled "Car Wash '98", the release also carries the alternative title "Car Wash '98 (The Monday Nightclub Mixes)", as the group Monday Nightclub was involved in the mixing.

Track listing
 CD single
"Car Wash '98" (Mustard Edit) - 3:09	
"Car Wash '98" (Mustard Mix) - 6:45
"Car Wash '98" (Mustard Dub) - 5:34
"Car Wash '98" (Levent's & Olli's Cream City Club Mix) - 6:19
"Car Wash '98" (Levent's Talking About Dub Mix) - 7:56
"Car Wash" (Original Version) - 3:20	

 US 12" vinyl
"Car Wash" (Mustard Mix) – 6:45
"Car Wash" (Mustard Dub) – 5:34

Charts

Christina Aguilera and Missy Elliott version

In 2004, the American singer Christina Aguilera recorded a cover version of "Car Wash", featuring the rapper-singer Missy Elliott, giving the disco song a more modern feel and adding rapped verses from Elliott. In an interview, Aguilera said, "We had to change the key to be a little bit higher for my range. So we couldn't take the exact samples, but we brought in all these live instruments to recreate kind of this old, old classic, soulful feel and sound...."

"Car Wash" was the only single from the soundtrack to DreamWorks' computer animated film Shark Tale. Aguilera and Elliott's cover of "Car Wash" missed the U.S. Billboard Top 40, peaking at No. 63, while becoming a top five hit in the United Kingdom and became the 48th best-selling single in the United Kingdom of 2004 with sales of over 100,000 copies. In this context, the "car wash" the song refers to would be the place where Oscar (the main protagonist, voiced by Will Smith) works, where large sea animals who behave like cars are washed in the same manner.

Aguilera was paid $1 million for recording the song.

Music video
The music video to Aguilera's version shows her and Elliott as animated fish similar to those in the film, combined with scenes of Aguilera and Elliott recording the song in a recording studio. The video also includes scenes of Shark Tale. The scenes of Aguilera and Elliott recording the song in the studio were shot by Rich Newey, while the scenes of Aguilera as a jellyfish and Elliott as a fish were edited by Peter Lonsdale and John Venzon, who also edited Shark Tale''. Their fish versions are also shown in the end of the film.

In popular culture
It was ranked number five on the BMI's list of the top 10 songs played at Major League sports events for the 2009–2010 season.

Track listings
 CD single
"Car Wash"  – 3:51
"Can't Wait"  – 3:45
"Digits"  – 3:39
"Car Wash" 

 Pocket maxi single
"Car Wash" – 3:51
"Can't Wait" – 3:45

 Digital download
"Car Wash (Shark Tale Mix)" – 3:49
"Can't Wait" – 3:43
"Digits" – 3:38

Release history

Charts and certifications

Weekly charts

Year-end charts

Certifications

See also
 List of Billboard Hot 100 number-one singles of 1977
List of number-one R&B singles of 1976 (U.S.)
List of number-one R&B singles of 1977 (U.S.)

Notes

References

1976 debut singles
1998 singles
2004 singles
Billboard Hot 100 number-one singles
Cashbox number-one singles
RPM Top Singles number-one singles
Rose Royce songs
Christina Aguilera songs
Missy Elliott songs
Songs written for films
Songs written by Norman Whitfield
Song recordings produced by Norman Whitfield
MCA Records singles
DreamWorks Records singles
1976 songs
Interscope Records singles